David Bacon (1771 – August 27, 1817) was an American missionary in Michigan Territory.  He was born in Woodstock, Connecticut.  He worked primarily with the Ottawa and Chippewa tribes, although they were not particularly receptive to his Christian teachings.  He founded the town of Tallmadge, Ohio, which later became the center of the Congregationalist faith in Ohio.  He died in Hartford, Connecticut.

He was the father of  Rev. Leonard Bacon, and the writer Delia Bacon, best known for her work on the Shakespeare authorship question.

References 

1771 births
1817 deaths
People from Woodstock, Connecticut
American Congregationalist missionaries
Congregationalist missionaries in the United States
People from Tallmadge, Ohio
People of colonial Connecticut